Pultenaea purpurea is a species of flowering plant in the family Fabaceae and is endemic to the south of Western Australia. It is a small prostrate shrub with cylindrical leaves and yellow-orange and red flowers.

Description
Flowering mainly occurs from September to December and the fruit is a flattened pod.

Taxonomy and naming
This species was first formally described in 1853 by Nikolai Turczaninow who gave it the name Euchilus purpureus in the Bulletin de la Société impériale des naturalistes de Moscou. In 2005 Michael Douglas Crisp and L.A. Orthia changed the name to Pultenaea purpurea in Australian Systematic Botany.

Distribution and habitat
This pultenaea grows on flats, depressions and slopes in the Coolgardie, Esperance Plains and Mallee biogeographic regions of southern Western Australia.

Conservation status
Pultenaea purpurea is classified as "not threatened" by the Government of Western Australia Department of Parks and Wildlife.

References

purpurea
Eudicots of Western Australia
Plants described in 1853
Taxa named by Nikolai Turczaninow